Tula is a village in the Eastern District of Tutuila Island in American Samoa. Tula is located in Vaifanua County and had a population of 405 as of the 2010 U.S. Census.

Tula is located on Cape Matātula. It is the site of the former upland ridge settlement of Lefutu (AS-21-002).

Geography
Tula is the easternmost village on Tutuila Island, and is situated on the rugged northeast cape of Matātula. It is home to wide, white sand beaches and a prehistoric quarry. The Samoa Observatory, established in 1974 by National Oceanic and Atmospheric Administration (NOAA), sits on Cape Matātula just outside the village of Tula. NASA's Advanced Global Atmospheric Gases Experiment (AGAGE) measures more than 40 trace gases involved in stratospheric ozone depletion, climate change, and air quality at the observatory.

Cape Matā'ula and the nearby village of Onenoa feature small plantations, high cliffs, and forested slopes.

Demographics

History
Tula was one of the first settlements on Tutuila, having been settled by 600 BCE. Numerous ancient artifacts have been discovered at the prehistoric quarry near the town.

References

Populated places in American Samoa
Villages in American Samoa
Tutuila